Heide is a railway station in the town of Heide, Antwerp, Belgium. The station opened on 3 January 1897 on the Antwerp–Lage Zwaluwe railway, known in Belgium as Line 12.

Train services
The station is served by the following services:

Intercity services (IC-22) Essen – Antwerp – Mechelen – Brussels (weekdays)
Local services (L-22) Roosendaal – Essen – Antwerp – Puurs (weekdays)
Local services (L-22) Roosendaal – Essen – Antwerp (weekends)

External links
Belgian Railways website

Railway stations opened in 1897
Railway stations in Belgium
Railway stations in Antwerp Province
1897 establishments in Belgium